Bir-e Rasul Bakhsh (also Romanized as Bīr-e Rasūl Bakhsh; also known as Bīr) is a village in Kahir Rural District, in the Central District of Konarak County, Sistan and Baluchestan Province, Iran. At the 2006 census, its population was 279, in 63 families.

References 

Populated places in Konarak County